Falling Forward is an album by Christian rock musician Margaret Becker, released in 1998 by Sparrow Records.

Release and Reception
Falling Forward is the eighth release by Sparrow Records for Margaret Becker. The collection of 11 songs was released in April 1998. It marked a significant change from synth-driven pop to a more acoustic, soulful approach. Allmusic.com Reviewer Melinda Hill states, "Falling Forward is catchy and hypnotic. Becker leaves pure pop behind, bringing in electric guitars and a more alternative sensibility. The songs have taken on a new depth, unafraid to hit on the difficult things, ... Falling Forward ranks among the best that CCM has to offer, and is a wonderful new beginning for Becker"

CCM Magazine in its review of the album, writes, "Falling Forward paints a picture of life with all of its colors: some happy, some sad, some gut-wrenchingly painful, some tears-inducingly joyful."

Track listing 
 "I Don't Know How" (Margaret Becker, Robbie Nevil) - 5:20
 "Cave It In" (Becker, Byron Hagan, Michael Scott Quinlan) - 4:20
 "Clay and Water" (Becker, Tanya Leah Roman) - 5:03
 "Horses" (Becker, David Lichens, Brent Milligan, Tedd T) - 4:05
 "Deliver Me" (Becker, Nevil) - 5:09
 "Any Kind of Light" (Becker, Nevil) - 4:24
 "Irish Sea" (Becker, Tedd T) - 4:08
 "Coins and Promises" (Becker, Charles Garrett, Quinlan) - 5:11
 "Crawl" (Becker, Tedd T) - 3:05
 "Take Me In" (Becker) - 4:05
 "I Testify" (Becker, Nevil) - 3:40

Personnel 

 Margaret Becker – lead vocals, backing vocals (1, 2, 3, 5-11), electric guitar (2, 6-11), acoustic guitar (3, 5, 7, 8, 9), 12-string acoustic guitar (4), guitar solo (9)
 Byron Hagan – keyboards (1, 8), acoustic piano (2), string arrangements (8)
 Giles Reaves – keyboards (1)
 Robbie Nevil – programming (1), acoustic guitar (1), backing vocals (1)
 Tedd T – programming (1, 3, 4, 7, 8, 9)
 Michael Scott Quinlan – programming (2, 3, 8), backing vocals (2, 7, 9), electric guitar (8)
 Monroe Jones – keyboards (3, 5)
 Jeff Roach – acoustic piano (3), keyboards (5, 6, 10, 11)
 Jay Joyce – electric guitar (1)
 Lynn Nichols – electric guitar (1, 2, 7), classical guitar (2, 6)
 Dave Perkins – electric guitar (2), "ambiance" guitar (9)
 Gary Burnette – electric guitar (3, 5)
 George Cocchini – electric guitar (3, 5, 6, 8, 10, 11)
 David Lichens – electric guitar (4)
 Wade Jaynes – baritone guitar (4), electric guitar (8), bass (8)
 Charles Garrett – electric guitar (7, 8)
 Michael Hodge – acoustic guitar (8)
 Chris Feinstein – bass (1)
 Brent Milligan – bass (2, 7, 9), electric guitar (4)
 Mark Hill – bass (3, 5, 6, 10, 11)
 Craig Young – bass (4)
 Jeff Quimby – drums (1, 4)
 Dan Needham – drums (2, 3, 5, 6, 8, 11), percussion (3, 6, 11), programming (3), djembe (10)
 Derek Wyatt – drums (7, 9)
 Shane Holloman – percussion (2)
 John Catchings – cello (1)
 Carl Marsh – string arrangements (1)
 Chris Rodriguez – backing vocals (11)

Production

 Lynn Nichols – executive producer 
 Robbie Nevil – producer (1), recording (1)
 Tedd T – producer (1, 2, 4, 7, 8, 9)
 Monroe Jones – producer (3, 5, 6, 8, 10, 11), additional recording (3, 5, 6, 10, 11)
 Julian Kindred – recording (1, 2, 4, 7, 8, 9), additional recording (3, 5, 6, 10, 11), mixing at Antenna Studios
 Rick Will – recording (1)
 Marcelo Pennell – recording (2, 4, 7, 9)
 Jim Dineen – recording (3, 5, 6, 10, 11)
 Michael Scott Quinlan – additional recording (3, 5, 6, 10, 11), recording assistant (3, 5, 6, 10, 11)
 Chris Granger – recording assistant (3, 5, 6, 10, 11)
 October Studios, Nashville, Tennessee – recording studio
 The White House, Nashville, Tennessee – recording studio
 Antenna Studios, Franklin, Tennessee – recording studio
 Angie Cooley – mix assistant 
 Terry Watson – mix assistant 
 Hank Williams – mastering at MasterMix, Nashville, Tennessee
 Christiév Carothers – creative direction
 Jan Cook – art direction 
 Gina Binkley – design 
 Matthew Barnes – photography 
 Mary Beth Felts – grooming 
 Jamie Kearney – stylist

See also

References

Margaret Becker albums
1998 albums
Sparrow Records albums